Astley and Tyldesley are situated on the Manchester Coalfield, historically in Lancashire, now in Greater Manchester, England.

Geology
The underlying geology of Astley and Tyldesley comprises the sandstones, shales and coal seams of the Middle Coal Measures laid down during the Carboniferous period more than 300 million years ago and which outcrop from Shakerley to New Manchester where coal was mined from seams between the Worsley Four Foot and Arley mines. The seams generally dip towards the south and west and are affected by small faults. The Upper Coal Measures are not worked in this part of the coalfield. To the south of Astley the Coal Measures dip beneath the Permo-Triassic New Red Sandstone.

History
Coal was got in Tyldesley in 1429 when a dispute over "seacole" was recorded. It was used in the smithies of the Shakerley nailers. Some of the earliest small coal pits belonged to Francis Egerton, 3rd Duke of Bridgewater, and his successors the Bridgewater Trustees, and were situated at the east of the township near Chaddock Lane, and north at New Manchester where the coal seams outcropped. Other colliery companies operating in the area included Tyldesley Coal Company whose pits were north of Manchester Road as were those of the Shakerley Collieries. Astley and Tyldesley Collieries had coal mines at Gin Pit to the south of the railway. The last pit to open was Astley Green Colliery by the Bridgewater Canal in Astley Green.

Some of these companies joined with others to form Manchester Collieries in 1929 as a response to the decline in coal mining and better survive the difficult economic conditions of the time. Several collieries survived until after nationalisation in 1947. The last colliery to close was Astley Green in 1970.

Collieries

See also
List of Collieries in Astley and Tyldesley
Glossary of coal mining terminology
List of mining disasters in Lancashire

References

Notes

Citations

Bibliography

 
 
Collieries In Astley And Tyldesley
Collieries